Amargo may refer to:

Boron, California, formerly named Amargo
"Azúcar amargo", a song by Mexican singer Fey
Quassia amara, a plant used in traditional medicine